The 1918 Arkansas gubernatorial election was held on November 5, 1918.

Incumbent Democratic Governor Charles Hillman Brough won re-election to a second term, defeating Socialist nominee Clay Fulks with 93.43% of the vote.

Democratic primary

The Democratic primary election was held on May 28, 1918.

Candidates
Charles Hillman Brough, incumbent Governor
Lewis Cass "Shotgun" Smith, judge

Results

Socialist nomination

Candidate
Clay Fulk, of Searcy

Withdrew
Dan Hogan, Socialist candidate for Governor in 1906, 1910 and 1914

General election

Candidates
Charles Hillman Brough, Democratic
Clay Fulks, Socialist

The Republican Party did not field a candidate and endorsed Brough.

Results

References

Bibliography
 
 

1918
Arkansas
Gubernatorial
November 1918 events